Andreas Roland Grüntzig (25 June 1939 – 27 October 1985) was a German radiologist and cardiologist, with foundational interest, training and research in epidemiology and angiology. He is known for being the first to develop successful balloon angioplasty for expanding lumens of narrowed arteries. He was born in Dresden.

Early life
Andreas Roland Gruentzig was born in Dresden, Germany on 25 June 1939, shortly before the start of World War II. His father, Dr. Wilmar Gruentzig (1902–1945), was a secondary-school science teacher with a PhD in chemistry. Wilmar was conscripted into the meteorological service of the Luftwaffe during World War II. He presumably died during the war. His mother was Charlotta (née Zeugner) Gruentzig (1907-1995) and a teacher. His older brother was Johannes Gruentzig. After his birth in Dresden, in 1940 the family moved to the house of a relative in the small town of Rochlitz in western Saxony. After the war, Charlotta and her sons moved to Leipzig along with her sister Alfreda Beier and her mother. In 1950, Charlotta moved her family to Buenos Aires, Argentina to live with her husband's brother and wife. Unhappy and homesick Charlotta and her two sons moved back to Leipzig two years later. Gruentzig and his brother Johannes entered high school at the Thomasschule zu Leipzig. Gruetzig graduated from the Thomasschule in 1957 with highest honors. In 1956, his brother Johannes fled across the border to Hanover. Gruentzig followed a year later.

Gruentzig studied at Bunsen Gymnasium while his brother enrolled as a medical student at Heidelberg University. Gruentzig began his medical studies at Heidelberg University in autumn 1958, subsequently graduating on 8 April 1964. He then rotated through a series of internships in Mannheim, Hanover, Bad Harzburg, and Ludwigshafen. His studies included internal medicine and vascular surgery. In 1966 Gruentzig returned to Heidelberg University to take on a staff assistant job at the university's Institute for Social and Occupational Medicine investigating risk factors for cardiovascular disease, chronic bronchitis, and liver degeneration. In 1967, he departed for a six-month paid fellowship to study epidemiology at the University of London School of Hygiene. In 1968 he returned to Heidelberg. Early in 1968 he left for a six-month assistant doctor's job in Darmstadt at the Max Ratschow Clinic.

In November 1969, Gruentzig and his future wife Michaela moved to Zurich where he worked in the department of Angiology at the University Hospital of Zurich.

Angioplasties
In the late 1960s, Gruentzig learned of the angioplasty procedure developed by Charles Dotter, an American, at a lecture in Frankfurt, Germany. Encountering bureaucratic resistance in Germany to his exploration of angioplasty techniques, Gruentzig moved to Switzerland in 1969.

Gruentzig's first successful coronary angioplasty treatment on an awake human was performed on 16 September 1977, in Zurich, Switzerland. He expanded a short, about 3 mm, non-branching section of the Left Anterior Descending (LAD) artery (the front branch of the left coronary artery) which supplies the front wall and tip of the heart (see coronary circulation) which had a high grade stenosis, about 80%, of the lumen. Gruentzig presented the results of his first four angioplasty cases at the 1977 American Heart Association (AHA) meeting, which led to widespread acknowledgement of his pioneering work.

The immediate results of this treatment, despite using only a carefully kitchen built catheter (crude by current standards), were quite good. The patient became and remained angina free after this treatment. This initial patient's result was electively rechecked, by angiography at Emory University, on the 10-year anniversary of the initial treatment. The LAD narrowing, after this 10-year timespan, remained almost perfectly expanded. There was minimal residual narrowing, probably less than 10%, as seen in similar angle and multiple different views comparing with photographs of the original, 10 years earlier, before and after results.

The excellent results of this initial and subsequent patients were critical to the rapid development and growing acceptance of the angioplasty treatment option. Gruentzig recognized multiple important issues early: (a) the treatment would not be readily accepted by most physicians, especially bypass surgeons, (b) it could easily lead to bad outcomes without great care in selection of which patients/lesions to treat and of the treating physicians, and (c) it required careful teaching of the technique and its potential difficulties and pitfalls to other physicians, so as to proactively reduce the occurrence of poor results. Understanding these issues and tireless effort on his part are widely recognized in cardiology for being of fundamental importance to the ultimate success of the technique.

By about 1990, lumen stenosis of the coronary arteries was more commonly treated by the angioplasty technique than by coronary artery bypass surgery. This treatment approach is now referred to as plain old balloon angioplasty (POBA).

In the 1990s, further major improvements, both immediate and especially long term became possible with better understanding of disease as a result of clinical research trials using IVUS and the development of stents to mechanically support POBA results.

Since the later 1990s, most angioplasties also involve a stent over the angioplasty balloon; the balloon is hydraulically expanded, typically at 6–25 atmospheres of internal pressure, then deflated and removed while the stent remains behind to mechanically support the lumen remaining in the new, more open shape as created by the hydraulically expanded balloon.

Gruentzig's success remains a major breakthrough and great contribution to the field of medicine in demonstrating that doctors could work inside of the arteries safely, without the need for open surgery. By utilizing the arterial circulation as a "therapeutic highway", many types of devices and drugs can now be delivered directly to the heart, kidneys, carotid arteries, brain, legs and aorta without the need for major surgery and general anesthesia.

Personal life
Gruentzig fathered an out-of-wedlock daughter named Katrin Hoffman in 1967.

Around the same time, Gruentzig met Michaela (née Seebrunner) Gruentzig. They were married in the summer of 1970 at Michaela's Bavarian family home in Bad Reichenhall. They subsequently had a daughter Sonja Meret Gruentzig who was born in September 1976. Their marriage ended when Michaela and their daughter returned to Zurich in 1981. At that time, Gruentzig was spending most of his time with an Emory medical student, Margaret Anne Thornton of Macon, Georgia. Gruentzig and Thornton married in 1983.

Gruentzig also had a cardiac catheterization done on himself by hifellows Hal 'Whit' Whitworth and Gary S. Roubin in 1985. Gruentzig dressed himself 20 minutes after the procedure was done, headed back to his office and resumed his work while applying pressure to the puncture site with his hand in his pocket. He felt that if "knowing the coronary anatomy via angiography was good for his patients it would be good for himself".

Death and legacy
Gruentzig, an instrument-rated pilot, and his wife, Margaret Anne, died in an airplane crash in their Beechcraft Baron in Forsyth, Georgia, on 27 October 1985. They are both buried in Riverside Cemetery (Macon, Georgia). The Grüntzig Ethica award for contributions to interventional cardiology is named for him.

See also
History of invasive and interventional cardiology

References

Further reading

External links
 Andreas Grüntzig and Angioplasty (includes video clips)

1939 births
1985 deaths
Accidental deaths in Georgia (U.S. state)
Aviators killed in aviation accidents or incidents in the United States
German cardiologists
German radiologists
Victims of aviation accidents or incidents in 1985